John Kapele (October 19, 1937 – June 28, 2017) was an American football defensive end and defensive tackle. He played for the Pittsburgh Steelers from 1960 to 1962 and for the Philadelphia Eagles in 1962.

He died on June 28, 2017, in Kaneohe, Hawaii at age 79.

References

1937 births
2017 deaths
American football defensive ends
American football defensive tackles
Utah Utes football players
BYU Cougars football players
Pittsburgh Steelers players
Philadelphia Eagles players